Gerald Robert Jones (born February 14, 1944) of Dayton, Ohio is a former American football player who played for the Atlanta Falcons and New Orleans Saints of the National Football League (NFL). He played college football at Bowling Green State University.

Jerry was a graduate of Dunbar High School, class of 1962. He received a Bachelor of Science from Bowling Green State University in 1966. 

After his football career, Jerry served as Sergeant-at-Arms in the Ohio House of Representatives. And then taught in Dayton Public Schools until his retirement.

At age 67, Jerry past away (December 4, 2011) at his residence.

References

1944 births
Living people
American football tackles
Bowling Green Falcons football players
Atlanta Falcons players
New Orleans Saints players
Players of American football from Dayton, Ohio